Hope for Wildlife (HFW) is a non-profit wildlife rehabilitation and education centre located on a farm in Seaforth, Halifax Nova Scotia, Canada. It was founded by Hope Swinimer in 1997 as The Eastern Shore Wildlife Rehabilitation and Rescue Centre. It got its current name in 2005. A television series, Hope for Wildlife, began documenting the centre's efforts in 2009.

The centre is dedicated to providing care to injured and orphaned animals before releasing them back into the wild. It also seeks to connect people to wildlife in a positive way through education for a sustainable future. As of 2018, the center has helped over 40,000 animals return to their wild habitat, representing over 200 species. The money for the farm comes mostly from small donations. Bigger donations come from events like the open house where people tour the farm, a government grant for summer internships, and money from the TV show. In an interview with a local paper, Swinimer admits the show is "a little hammed up," but it brings money into the rehab centre and children from all over the country write letters asking about the animals. A volunteer tells of meeting people in South Africa who first heard of Nova Scotia on the show, which airs in more than 20 countries."

History 
While working at Dartmouth Veterinary Hospital in 1995, Hope Swinimer received as a patient a robin that had been attacked by a cat, and while taking care of the bird she developed an eagerness to learn more about taking care of injured wildlife. Her passion quickly led her to start doing wildlife rehabilitation as a full-time career, turning her home into a makeshift rehabilitation center, starting with a few cages in the backyard and using her spare room as a nursery. In 1996, the Department of Natural Resources (DNR) required Hope to obtain a wildlife rehabilitation permit for her makeshift wildlife center even though such a permit did not exist in Nova Scotia at the time. Hope worked with DNR to establish a licensing process that allowed for wildlife rehabilitation in the province. In 1997 she received her rehabilitation permit and moved to Winnie's Way in Seaforth, Nova Scotia. Here she established the Eastern Shore Wildlife Rescue and Rehabilitation Centre. The centre became the first fully operating wildlife rescue facility in Nova Scotia. After just a few years the demands for the centre's help outgrew the property and in 2001 Hope moved again. Staying in Seaforth, Hope moved to a farm property which allowed for expansion to her growing enterprise. Five years after this move, the Eastern Shore Wildlife Rescue and Rehabilitation Centre officially became known as Hope for Wildlife, a registered charitable organization that continues to grow.

In 2012, the primary worker at HFW for 8 years, and then manager, Allison Dube, left and moved to Scotland.
As of 2015, the centre had helped over 15,000 animals from over 250 species.
In 2018, a major member of HFW, Reid Steward Patterson, died.
As of 2018, the centre had helped over 40,000 animals.

Mission statement 
The organization has put forth a mission statement to outline what it wishes to achieve. It lists three main goals:
 Rescue, rehabilitate and reintroduce to the wild injured and orphaned wildlife.
 Educate others about the importance of conserving wild animals and the ecosystems that sustain them. 
 Research and develop the knowledge and understanding necessary for the conservation and management of wildlife.

Progress 
Since 1997 the facility has grown phenomenally, starting with development of the education centre which allowed for people to visit the facility and learn about wildlife and what the organization does. The education centre itself grew and now consists of one building, an outdoor pavilion and wildlife gardens. Many accomplishments have been made on the rehabilitation side of the facility too. Hope for Wildlife became the first in the province to legally rehabilitate and release white tailed deer and birds of prey, developing a 100-foot-long flight cage for large birds and a deer enclosure which consists of over an acre of field and a small barn designed for raising orphaned white tailed deer. The facility hit a milestone when they opened the first wildlife veterinary hospital in the province back in 2012. The next big projects consisted of building a marine unit, for the growing number of injured seal pups and sea birds. Following the marine unit a large mammal unit was constructed at the back of the property for the larger predator mammals, such as bobcats. On average, the centre sees about 3,500 animals a year, continuing to take in more animals each year. These animals may have been injured, orphaned or lost. Animals the centre has worked with include fox, deer, raccoons, skunks and beavers.

The centre receives approximately 10,000 callers a year to its wildlife helpline, which is put in place for anyone who comes into contact with a wild animal in need of assistance.

Funding 
The organization gets most of its funding from small donations given by the public, both those who visit the centre and those who call the helpline. The majority of donations are around $10 and pay for about $95,000 of necessities such as feed, cleaning supplies, and building upkeep.

Larger donations come from events like the annual open house that the centre hosts, gift shop proceeds, government grants set forth for summer internships and any money coming from a TV series, simply named Hope for Wildlife, that follows many of the organization's stories.

Television series 

Produced by Arcadia Content the documentary series, "Hope for Wildlife", follows the team as they nurse thousands of injured and orphaned wildlife back to health and return them to the wild. The stories of the animals and the team members that devote their lives to saving them are depicted in each episode. Filming of the first season began in 2009 and the series is currently airing its tenth season as of 2020. Episodes are an hour long. Online episodes can be found on Arcadia Wild, Oasis HD, The Knowledge Network, and CottageLife. In the United States, 30-minute episodes known as Hope in the Wild air as part of the CBS Dream Team programming block.

The show also has additional coverage at Dr. Barry's practice. And the Metro Animal Emergency Clinic. It also had some additional coverage at Hope's city pound, Homeward Bound City Pound, that she operated from 2010 to 2020.

Episode 100 was aired on 1 February 2019, filmed in the 21st year of the centre's history (during summer 2018).

In 2019, a spin-off TV show, "Doctor Barry" focusing on veterinarian Barry MacEachern and the Burnside Veterinary Hospital premiered.

Cast
Human
 Hope — founder 
 Dr. Barry — veterinarian 
 Allison — manager 
 Rebecca — staff
 Nicole — staff
Tiffany — Homebound City Pound staff
 Sara — staff
 Zach — staff
 Erin — intern 
 Dr. Krystal Woo — first live-in vet 

Animal

Gretel — resident pine marten
Oliver — resident barred owl
 Maxwell — resident skunk
 Dan — pet peacock
Scotty — resident pigeon

Seasons

List of episodes

Season 1 
Episode 1: "A New Hope"

Episode 2: "Gala"

Episode 3: "Outfoxed"

Episode 4: "Chase the Seal"

Episode 5: "Foxes in the Henhouse"

Episode 6: "Ester the Moose"

Episode 7: "Copper"

Episode 8: "Outbreak: Part One"

Episode 9: "Outbreak: Part Two"

Episode 10: "A Bright Spot"

Episode 11: "Saying Goodbye"

Episode 12: "Open House"

 Annual Open House

Episode 13: "Deerly Beloved"

Season 2 
Episode 14: "Hope Renewed"

Episode 15: "Second Chance"

Episode 16: "Chester and Wilson"

Episode 17: "Deer Friends"

Episode 18: "Murder of Crows"

Episode 19: "Call of Duty"

Episode 20: "I Like Turtles"

Episode 21: "Of Beaks and Buckshot"

Episode 22: "Wiley and Sly"

Episode 23: "The Blushing Bride"

Episode 24: "Wasn't that a Party"

 Annual Open House

Episode 25: "Hope's Notes"

Episode 26: "Earl, Meet Ralph"

Season 3 
Episode 27: "Hope Springs Eternal"

Episode 28: "Bears!"

 Trip to Vancouver

Episode 29: "First Fawns"

Episode 30: "Saving Seals"

 Trip to Vancouver

Episode 31: "Unlikely Recruits"

Episode 32: "Education & Inspiration"

Episode 33: "Zoli"

 Trip to Southern California

Episode 34: "For the Birds"

 Trip

Episode 35: "Later Gator"

 Trip to Southwest Florida.
 Hope and Dr. Barry visit the Clinic for Rehabilitation of Wildlife (CROW) and Conservancy of Southwest Florida.

Episode 36: "Howdy, Hope!"

 Trip to Texas

Episode 37: "Coast to Coast"

 Trip to San Diego, California

Episode 38: "The Hope Files"

Episode 39: "Letting Go"

 Annual Open House

Season 4 
Episode 40: "Hope for Marine Life 1"

Episode 41: "Hope for Marine Life 2"

Episode 42: "Shubie & Kayla"

Episode 43: "Bear Necessities"

Episode 44: "Call Me Maybe"

Episode 45: "Big City Hope"

 Trip to Toronto

Episode 46: "Windy City Hope"

 Trip to Chicago, Illinois, USA

Episode 47: "Howl for Nightlife"

 Trip

Episode 48: "Phases, Stages & Changes"

Episode 49: "Monkey 101"

 Trip to Piedras Blancas National Park, Costa Rica.
 Hope and Dr. Barry visit the Osa Wildlife Sanctuary (Fundacion Santuario Silvestre de Osa)
 Featured animals: Sweetie the Spider Monkey, Joy the Scarlet Macaw, Boogie the Tayra, Little Chonchito the Collared Peccary, Precioso and Pablo the White-Faced Capuchins, Guapo the Mantled Howler Monkey.

Episode 50: "Power & Primates"

 Trip to Nosara, Costa Rica.
Hope and Dr. Barry visit the Refuge for Wildlife and Sibu Sanctuary.
Featured animals: Felicia, Tripod, Nocilo, Oliver, and Charlie the Mantled Howler Monkeys, Tiki the Squirrel Monkey, Marcel and Toby the White-Faced Capuchins.

Episode 51: "The Swan's Song"

Episode 52: "Winter is Coming"

 Annual Open House

Season 5 
Episode 53: "Spring Forward"

Episode 54: "Just Another Day"

Episode 55: "A Very Precious Thing"

Episode 56: "Shot in the Dark"

Episode 57: "The Fox and the 'Hog"

 Trip to England

Episode 58: "Home & Aboard"

 Trip to England

Episode 59: "Give & Take"

Episode 60: "Day in the Life"

Episode 61: "Open Hearts"

 Annual Open House. The event is so big, the police show-up.

Episode 62: "Hello Beautiful"

 A moose is loose in Halifax, Dr. Barry teams up with APAC Cuba, Pilots N Paws and the Atlantic Veterinary College, Nicole trains volunteers to care for barred owls and Tiffany places over 100 dogs from Animal Rescue Corp in new homes through the Maritimes.
Special Guests: Scarlett Jane and Skydiggers.
Featured Animals: Morris and Isla the Cuban street dogs, Scotty the resident pigeon,

Episode 63: "Hope for Humanity"

 Trip to Southwest Florida

Episode 64: "Hope for All Seasons"

Episode 65: "Ghost on a Wing "

Season 6 
Episode 66: "Hope for the Best"

Episode 67: "You Otter Know"

Episode 68: "Owl Be There"

Episode 69: "May is the New June"

Episode 70: "Surrogate Mothers"

Episode 71: "Brandi New"

Episode 72: "Batten Down the Hatches"

Episode 73: "Lodge and Order"

Episode 74: "Nearest and Deerest"

Episode 75: "Hatching, Catching and Patching Up"

Episode 76: "Breaking Ground"

Episode 77: "Always Open"

 Annual Open House

Episode 78: "Bat's All Folks"

Season 7 
Episode 79: "Hope for Spring"

Episode 80: "Meant for This Place"

Episode 81: "Going it Alone"

Episode 82: "Stepping Up"

Episode 83: "The Early Bird"

Episode 84: "Catch and Release"

Episode 85: "Whatever it Takes"

Episode 86: "A Wing and A Prayer"

Episode 87: "Axis Mundi"

Episode 88: "Party Crasher"

 Annual Open House

Episode 89: "Cat Out of the Bag"

Episode 90: "House and Home"

Episode 91: "Aguas de Marco"

Season 8 
Episode 92: "The New Hope"

Episode 93: "Chunk the Seal"

Episode 94: "Winter is for the Birds"

Episode 95: "Come from Away"

Episode 96: "Orphan Fox"

Episode 97: "Baby Boom is Here"

Episode 98: "A Safe Harbour"

Episode 99: "Eagle Has Flown"

Episode 100: "Hope 100" Airdate - February 1, 2019 

Episode 101: "Hope the Matchmaker"

Episode 102: "False Alarm"

Episode 103: "The First Fawn"

Episode 104: "Raccoon Wacky"

Episode 105: "The First Skunk"

Episode 106: "Orphans No More"

Episode 107: "Fox in the ER"

Episode 108: "Doug to Rescue"

Episode 109: "Bob to the Rescue"

Episode 110: "Bobcat Release"

Episode 111: "The Great Escape"

Episode 112: "Finally Free"

Episode 113: "CPR"

Episode 114: "Slick Situation"

Episode 115: "Garbage Day"

Episode 116: "The Heavens Open"

 Annual Open House

Episode 117: "Fawns Find Freedom"

Season 9 
Episode 118: "Stealing Hope"

Episode 119: "Kit's the Name"

Episode 120: "A Makeshift Family"

Episode 121: "Hello Goodbye"

Episode 122: "Fawns and Flippers"

Episode 123: "One in a Million"

Episode 124: "Hope for Californian Wildlife"

Episode 125: "Stanley"

Episode 126: "One Day Only"

 Annual Open House

Episode 127: "For the Moment"

Season 10 
Episode 128: "Frozen Hope" Airdate - April 24, 2020

Episode 129: "Lila the Bear" Airdate - May 1, 2020

Episode 130: "Harp Seals" Airdate - May 8, 2020

Episode 131: "You're Owl Wet" Airdate - May 15, 2020

Episode 132: "A Raccoon, A Ring and Four Rescues" Airdate - May 22, 2020

Episode 133: "Near & Deer" Airdate - May 29, 2020

Episode 134: "Black Bear, Red Tape" Airdate - June 5, 2020

 Annual Open House

Episode 135: "Hurricane!" Airdate - June 12, 2020

Episode 136: "The Buzzard's Breakfast" Airdate - June 19, 2020

Episode 137: "Spring" Airdate - June 26, 2020

Hope TV 

Hope TV is the online TV channel based around what happens at HFW. The site launched in the spring of 2017.

Footnotes

References

External links
 Official website (foundation): https://www.hopeforwildlife.net (website)
 Official website (HOPE TV): http://hopeforwildlife.tv/ (web channel)
 Official website (TV series): http://arcadiacontent.com/portfolio/hope-for-wildlife (TV producer)
 TV series production company: http://arcadiacontent.com 
 TV production company streaming site: http://arcadiawild.com/videos/hope-for-wildlife/
 

Wildlife rehabilitation and conservation centers
Non-profit organizations based in Nova Scotia
Animal welfare organizations based in Canada